Verkhniye Marki is a rural locality (a selo) in Markovskoye Rural Settlement, Kamensky District, Voronezh Oblast, Russia. The population was 383 as of 2010. There are 4 streets.

Geography 
Verkhniye Marki is located 18 km northeast of Kamenka (the district's administrative centre) by road. Marki is the nearest rural locality.

References 

Rural localities in Kamensky District, Voronezh Oblast